Mad Detective Di Renjie, also known as Amazing Detective Di Renjie 4, is the fourth installment in a four-season Chinese television series based on gong'an detective stories related to Di Renjie, a Tang dynasty magistrate and statesman. Written and directed by Qian Yanqiu, the series starred Liang Guanhua as the titular protagonist, and was first broadcast on CCTV-8 in 2010, two years after the third season.

Plot
The plot is divided into two parts as follows:
 Jin Yin Qi An (金银奇案)
 Sha Ren Xian Jing (杀人陷阱)

Cast
 Liang Guanhua as Di Renjie
 Zhang Zijian as Li Yuanfang
 Lü Zhong as Wu Zetian
 Yuan Ran as Wu Yuanmin (Princess Yingyang)
 Qu Zhazha as Di Ruyan
 Xu Qian as Zeng Tai
 Fu Jun as Sha'er Khan
 Su Hao as Di Fu
 Liang Kai as Zhang Huan
 Yan Yansheng as Wang Xiaojie
 Zheng Nan as Chunhong
 Li Junqi as Ilterish Qaghan
 Li Zhuolin as Li Lang
 Liu Lei as Zhong Wuniang
 Suzuki Miki as Youze Lihui
 Dai Yunxia as Fenghuang
 Zheng Cheng as Yizhigumalü
 Yang Zengyuan as Wulezhi / Jiwangjue Khan
 Li Xi'er as Consort Nalu
 Li Shilong as Wu Youde
 Liu Wendi as Prince Qiongta
 Wang Xinsheng as He Lu

References

External links
  Mad Detective Di Renjie (Season 4) on Sina.com

2010 Chinese television series debuts
Television series set in the Zhou dynasty (690–705)
Gong'an television series
Judge Dee
Cultural depictions of Wu Zetian
Cultural depictions of Di Renjie
Television series set in the 7th century